Dennis Wright (19 December 1919 – August 1993) was an English football goalkeeper who played for Mansfield Town.

A native of Boythorpe near Chesterfield, Wright initially joined Mansfield in March 1939, shortly before the outbreak of World War II. However, due to the hostilities, he had to wait until 1946 before he made his debut for the club in a competitive game. During the war years, Wright served in the British Army, and was stationed in Northern Ireland most of that time. He guested for Glenavon during the war, and also turned out for Nottingham Forest during the wartime competition.

After the war had ended, he returned to Mansfield, and made his debut on 12 October 1946 against Leyton Orient. He remained Mansfield's first-choice goalkeeper for the next decade, and played a total of 399 first-team matches for the club, which was a club record at the time of his retirement from the game in 1957. He died in 1993, aged 73.

References

1919 births
1993 deaths
English footballers
Mansfield Town F.C. players
Association football goalkeepers
British Army personnel of World War II